The Long Rapids Formation is a geologic formation in Ontario. It preserves fossils dating back to the Devonian period.

See also

 List of fossiliferous stratigraphic units in Ontario

References
 

Devonian Ontario
Oil shale in Canada
Oil shale formations
Devonian southern paleotemperate deposits